Maren Tschinkel (born September 14, 1998) is a German international supermodel and beauty pageant titleholder who was crowned as Miss Germany 2018. She represented Germany in the Miss Earth 2018 international pageant.

Life 
Maren Tschinkel was born in Ravensburg, Germany. She started modeling after graduating from high school. She is an international model and represents different agencies. She worked for many famous brands including Victoria’s Secret, Guess, and has been on known magazine covers like Harper’s Bazaar and L'Officiel. 
She studied Economics at the University of Augsburg.

Awards and Titles 
 Miss Earth Germany 2018

References

External links
 
 

1998 births
Living people
People from Ravensburg
University of Augsburg alumni
German beauty pageant winners
German female models